Ngwevu is a genus of massospondylid sauropodomorph dinosaur from the Lower Jurassic of South Africa. The genus contains one species, Ngwevu intloko.

Discovery and naming 
The genus Ngwevu is known from only one specimen, BP/1/4779, which is stored in the Environmental Studies Institute of the University of the Witwatersrand, in Johannesburg, South Africa. The holotype specimen was discovered in 1978 by James William Kitching in the Tevrede Farm, located in Fouriesburg district, South Africa. The strata which preserved the specimen was located in the Clarens Formation, which is Pliensbachian-early Toarcian in age. The specimen was initially considered a specimen of the genus Massospondylus but in 2019 was designated as a new genus and species Ngwevu ntloko (pronounced "'Ng-g'where-voo" ; directly from Xhosa 'ngwevu' and 'intloko' meaning "grey skull").

Description 
Previously, the specimen was noted to share some different traits compared to other Massospondylus specimens but the differences were considered a result of deformation. In the description of the new genus, it was revealed that these differences cannot be attributed to deformation, and in fact the specimen is well intact. Another hypothesis presumed the differences found in Ngwevu could be attributed to a less advanced ontogenetic stage, with some paleontologists considering it to be a younger specimen of Massospondylus. However, histological study of the holotype of Ngwevu suggests it was an adult (about 10 years old) when it fossilized, rejecting this hypothesis as well. The describing authors of Ngwevu also noted that Ngwevu was proportionately more robust than specimens of Massospondylus.

Phylogeny 
Despite the fact that Ngwevu could be distinguished from Massospondylus, there are several shared features between the two genera. A phylogenetic analysis conducted in the describing paper corroborates this, placing Ngwevu intloko in the Massospondylidae. A portion of the analysis is reproduced below.

Paleobiology 
The snout of Ngwevu has been noted to have a wider snout than Massospondylus, which has been proposed to be a sign of a more generalist diet as opposed to selective behavior. The cranium also has adaptations for a more powerful bite force than Massospondylus which lends more support to niche partititioning between the two taxa.

References

Massospondylidae
Pliensbachian life
Early Jurassic dinosaurs of Africa
Jurassic South Africa
Fossils of South Africa
Fossil taxa described in 2019

Toarcian life